Algerita is a common name for several species of barberry, including:

Mahonia haematocarpa, native to southwestern North America
Mahonia trifoliolata, native to southwestern North America